Hossein Bahrami (born 1995) is an Iranian football midfielder who currently plays for Iranian football club Siah Jamegan in the Persian Gulf Pro League.

Club career
Bahrami joined Esteghlal Ahvaz in summer 2014. He made his professional debut against Esteghlal on August 21, 2015 as a starter. Bahrami joined Esteghlal Khuzestan in the summer of 2016 after Esteghlal Ahvaz was relegated from the Persian Gulf Pro League.

Club career statistics

References

External links
 Hossein Bahrami at IranLeague.ir

1995 births
Living people
Iranian footballers
Esteghlal Ahvaz players
Association football midfielders
People from Behbahan
Sportspeople from Khuzestan province